In all fields of electrical engineering, power conversion is the process of converting electric energy from one form to another. A power converter is an electrical or electro-mechanical device for converting electrical energy. A power converter can convert alternating current (AC) into direct current (DC) and vice versa; change the voltage or frequency of the current or do some combination of these. The power converter can be as simple as a transformer or it can be a far more complex system, such as resonant converter. The term can also refer to a class of electrical machinery that is used to convert one frequency of alternating current into another. Power conversion systems often incorporate redundancy and voltage regulation.

Power converters are classified based on the type of power conversion they do. One way of classifying power conversion systems is according to whether the input and output are alternating current or direct current. Finally, the task of all power converters is to process and control the flow of electrical energy by supplying voltages and currents in a form that is optimally suited for user loads.

DC power conversion

DC to DC

The following devices can convert DC to DC:
Linear regulator
Voltage regulator
Motor–generator
Rotary converter
Switched-mode power supply

DC to AC
The following devices can convert DC to AC:
Power inverter
Motor–generator
Rotary converter
Switched-mode power supply
Chopper (electronics)

AC power conversion

AC to DC
The following devices can convert AC to DC:
Rectifier
Mains power supply unit (PSU)
Motor–generator
Rotary converter
Switched-mode power supply

AC to AC

The following devices can convert AC to AC:
Transformer or autotransformer
Voltage converter
Voltage regulator
Cycloconverter
Variable-frequency transformer
Motor–generator
Rotary converter
Switched-mode power supply

Other systems

There are also devices and methods to convert between power systems designed for single and three-phase operation.

The standard power voltage and frequency vary from country to country and sometimes within a country. In North America and northern South America, it is usually 120 volts, 60 hertz (Hz), but in Europe, Asia, Africa, and many other parts of the world, it is usually 230 volts, 50 Hz. Aircraft often use 400 Hz power internally, so 50 Hz or 60 Hz to 400 Hz frequency conversion is needed for use in the ground power unit used to power the airplane while it is on the ground. Conversely, internal 400 Hz internal power may be converted to 50 Hz or 60 Hz for convenience power outlets available to passengers during flight.

Certain specialized circuits can also be considered power converters, such as the flyback transformer subsystem powering a CRT, generating high voltage at approximately 15 kHz.

Consumer electronics usually include an AC adapter (a type of power supply) to convert mains-voltage AC current to low-voltage DC suitable for consumption by microchips. Consumer voltage converters (also known as "travel converters") are used when traveling between countries that use ~120 V versus ~240 V AC mains power. (There are also consumer "adapters" which merely form an electrical connection between two differently shaped AC power plugs and sockets, but these change neither voltage nor frequency.)

Why use transformers in power converters

Transformers are used in power converters to incorporate:
Electrical isolation
Voltage step-down or step up

The secondary circuit is floating, when you touch the secondary circuit, you merely drag its potential to your body's potential or the earth's potential. There will be no current flowing through your body. That's why you can use your cellphone safely when it is being charged, even if your cellphone has a metal shell and is connected to the secondary circuit.

Operating at high frequency and supplying low power, power converters have much smaller transformers as compared with those of fundamental frequency, high power applications. Usually, in power systems, transformers transmit power simultaneously, no charge! The current in the primary winding of a transformer plays two roles:
It sets up the mutual flux in accordance with Ampere's law.
It balances the demagnetizing effect of the load current in the secondary winding.

Flyback converter's transformer works differently, like an inductor.
In each cycle, the flyback converter's transformer first gets charged and then releases its energy to the load. Accordingly, the flyback converter's transformer air gap has two functions. It not only determines inductance but also stores energy. For the flyback converter, the transformer gap can have the function of energy transmission through cycles of charging and discharging.

The core's relative permeability  can be > 1,000, even > 10,000. While the air gap features much lower permeability, accordingly has higher energy density.

See also
Power supply
Cascade converter
Motor-generator
Resonant converter
Rotary converter

References

Abraham I. Pressman (1997). Switching Power Supply Design. McGraw-Hill. .
Ned Mohan, Tore M. Undeland, William P. Robbins (2002). Power Electronics: Converters, Applications, and Design. Wiley. .
Fang Lin Luo, Hong Ye, Muhammad H. Rashid (2005). Digital Power Electronics and Applications. Elsevier. .
Fang Lin Luo, Hong Ye (2004). Advanced DC/DC Converters. CRC Press. .
Mingliang Liu (2006). Demystifying Switched-Capacitor Circuits. Elsevier. .

External links
A general description of DC-DC converters
U.S. based 50 Hz, 60 Hz, and 400 Hz frequency converter manufacturer
GlobTek, Inc. Glossary of electric power supply and power conversion terms

 
Electric power systems components
Electronic engineering